The Ministry of Communications Equipment Industry (MPSS) was a government ministry in the Soviet Union.

History
By ukase of the Presidium of the Supreme Soviet of 28 June 1946, the Ministry of Electrical Industry was divided into the Ministry of Electrical Industry and the Ministry of Communications Equipment Industry. The Ministry of Communications Equipment Industry was given jurisdiction over enterprises and organizations producing radar, radio engineering, and telephone and telegraph equipment, vacuum tubes, storage batteries, battery cells and carbon electrical products.

The ministry was re-established on 30 March 1974; had overall responsibility for production of communication equipment (including radio and television, telegraph and telephone, and satellite communications equipment), and for overall construction of a country-wide unified communications network.

List of ministers
Source:
 Erien Pervyshin (11.4.1974 - 17.7.1989)

References